Lloyd Edwin Albert Costello (10 December 1922 – 20 June 2001) was an Australian politician.

He was born in Flowerdale, and served in the Royal Australian Air Force from 1941 to 1946. In 1959 he was elected to the Tasmanian House of Assembly as the Labor member for Braddon. He served as Chair of Committees from 1961 to 1969 and as a minister from 1972 until his resignation from the House in 1975.

References

1922 births
2001 deaths
Members of the Tasmanian House of Assembly
Australian Labor Party members of the Parliament of Tasmania
Royal Australian Air Force personnel of World War II
20th-century Australian politicians